Frederick James Wilcox (26 December 1882 – 5 April 1959) was an English professional footballer who made 184 appearances in the Football League, most of which were in the First Division, with  (renamed during his first spell at the club) and Middlesbrough.

Life and career
Wilcox was born in Bristol and began his senior career with Southern League club Bristol Rovers in 1901. His dribbling and goalscoring soon attracted attention, and in March 1903 he joined Football League Second Division club Small Heath for a fee of £125 plus the proceeds of a friendly match between the clubs. In the six matches remaining, he scored seven goalstwo on debut against Blackpool, four in a 12–0 defeat of Doncaster Rovers that remains the club's record victory, and the winner against Manchester United in the last match of the campaignand Small Heath were promoted to the First Division as Second Division runners-up.

The following season he was joint leading scorer in league matches, though with only eight goals, as the team established itself at the higher level. In 1904–05 he played and scored for The North against The South in an England international trial, but the selectors preferred Stanley Harris at inside left. Wilcox and partner Oakey Field gained a reputation as the "best left wing in the First League" of that season, but both were injured towards the end of the campaign as Small Heath, who had been challenging for the title, were only able to finish seventh. Wilcox still managed twelve goals, and a further five in 1905–06 as he again lost time to injury and to a reported disagreement with the club.

In March 1906, Wilcox was one of three highly rated playersEngland internationalsSteve Bloomer and Billy Brawn being the otherswho were brought to Middlesbrough in the hope of helping the struggling team avoid relegation from the First Division. Despite the gloomy prognostications of the Observer, they did retain their top-flight status. In 1906–07 Wilcox contributed twelve league goals as Middlesbrough finished 11th and a further five the following season in a 6th-place finish. In the later stages of his time at Middlesbrough, he was converted to play at half back, and was reported a great success at either centre half or left half. He suffered a knee injury during a match in March 1909 that effectively put an end to his career. He appeared once more for Middlesbrough, in October.

Wilcox rejoined Birmingham in January 1911, and the 1911 census, taken some two months later, recorded his occupation as professional footballer for Birmingham F.C., but he made no first-team appearances. The 1939 Register lists him as a stacker in a brewery stores, living with his wife, Annie, in Woodlands Street, Smethwick, where he died in 1959.

Notes

References
General
 
 
Specific

1882 births
1959 deaths
Footballers from Bristol
English footballers
Association football inside forwards
Association football wing halves
Bristol Rovers F.C. players
Birmingham City F.C. players
Middlesbrough F.C. players
Southern Football League players
English Football League players